Henri de Peyerimhoff de Fontenelle full name Marie Antoine Hercule Henri de Peyerimhoff (27 July 1838 – 9 April 1877) was a magistrate and entomologist from Alsace, France. He is known for his work with smaller moths.

Life

Henri de Peyerimhoff de Fontenelle was born on 27 July 1838 in Colmar, Alsace.
His parents were Jean-Baptiste Hercule de Peyerimhoff de Fontenelle (1809–1890), mayor of Colmar, and Marie-Rose Béchelé.
His father's family originated in 14th-century Alsace near the borders with Bavaria and Baden. 
The Catholic branch associated with Switzerland assumed the name "Peyerimhoff de Fontenelle" in the late 18th century.
His father was head of the Colmar municipal council and did much to modernise the city. 
Henri de Peyerimhoff became a magistrate and was also an entomologist who specialized in microlepidoptera (smaller moths).

Peyerimhoff married Marie George on 15 November 1870 in Strasbourg.
She was from the Bellaigues, a solid bourgeoisie de robe in Nancy.
When Alsace became part of Germany after the Franco-Prussian War of 1870, Peyerimhoff chose to remain French and became judge of the civil court of Moulins in 1873, and then of Perpignan.
His father remained in Colmar and became a deputy in the Landesausschuss, the state legislature.
Peyerimhoff suffered from poor health.
He died on 9 April 1877 in Perpignan at the age of 38.

Peyerimhoff left two sons, Henri de Peyerimhoff (1871–1953), who became a civil servant and businessman, and Paul de Peyerimhoff de Fontenelle (1873–1957), who joined the Forestry service and became an entomologist.
In his obituary of Peyerimhoff the Abbé Umhang wrote, "I have known more than one young man who has been passionate about a branch of natural history, and I have not seen any of them depart from the path of virtue and honor."
The preliminary results of his extensive studies of the Tortricidae of moths were published in the Annales de la Société Entomologique de France in 1876, but were incomplete at the time of his death.

Publications 

Publications by Henri de Peyerimhoff included:

Species named by Peyerimhoff

Notes

Sources

1838 births
1877 deaths
French entomologists
French magistrates
People from Colmar